The SourceForge Installer is a discontinued piece of software that was included in some downloads from SourceForge. It was often bundled with adware and crapware designed to trick people into installing unwanted software. SourceForge has been criticized about its use of this installer. Opinions of this feature vary, with some complaining about users not being as aware of what they are getting or being able to trust the downloaded content, whereas others see it as a reasonably harmless option that keeps individual projects and users in control.

History 
In July 2013, SourceForge started allowing project owners to sign up for DevShare. When the project owner signed up for this, the closed-source installer would be placed in the project. While most people opposed the use of it, many projects began using DevShare because part of the ad revenue was given to the owner. The most notable project to use this was FileZilla, an open-source FTP software.

As of early 2016, DevShare and the SourceForge Installer have been discontinued after BizX bought SourceForge.

References 

Adware